Burnsville Lake is both a recreational and flood control reservoir on Little Kanawha River located southeast of Burnsville in Braxton County, West Virginia. Burnsville Lake was authorized by the U.S. Congress in the Flood Control Act of 1938.

Construction of the Burnsville Lake project was begun in the summer of 1972 and the dam was completed in September 1976. The lake project controls the runoff from a drainage area of 165 square miles (427 km²). A gated spillway is located in the left abutment. The outlet works are located in the spillway section.

Many people in Burnsville and surrounding communities opposed the building of the dam since the back waters would flood areas currently occupied and locations of ancestral homes.  Cemeteries had to be moved and residents had to relocate. When the dam was built, there was no recreation area for local residents instead residents of Burnsville had to travel to Bulltown.

References

Data furnished by the Department of the Army.

See also
Battle of Bulltown, a Civil War skirmish near the upstream end of the lake

Bodies of water of Braxton County, West Virginia
Reservoirs in West Virginia
Little Kanawha River
United States Army Corps of Engineers dams
Dams in West Virginia
Dams completed in 1976
IUCN Category V